The 1928–29 Bradford City A.F.C. season was the 22nd in the club's history.

The club finished 1st in Division Three North, and reached the 4th round of the FA Cup. The club won promotion back to Division Two.

Sources

References

Bradford City A.F.C. seasons
Bradford City